Chitons are marine molluscs of varying size in the class Polyplacophora, formerly known as Amphineura. About 940 extant and 430 fossil species are recognized.

They are also sometimes known as gumboots or sea cradles or coat-of-mail shells or suck-rocks, or more formally as loricates, polyplacophorans, and occasionally as polyplacophores.

Chitons have a shell composed of eight separate shell plates or valves. These plates overlap slightly at the front and back edges, and yet articulate well with one another. Because of this, the shell provides protection at the same time as permitting the chiton to flex upward when needed for locomotion over uneven surfaces, and even allows the animal to curl up into a ball when dislodged from rocks. The shell plates are encircled by a skirt known as a girdle.

Habitat

Chitons live worldwide, from cold waters through to the tropics. They live on hard surfaces, such as on or under rocks, or in rock crevices.

Some species live quite high in the intertidal zone and are exposed to the air and light for long periods.

Chitons are exclusively and fully marine, in contrast to the bivalves, which were able to adapt to brackish water and fresh water, and the gastropods which were able to make successful transitions to freshwater and terrestrial environments.

Morphology

Shell
All chitons bear a protective dorsal shell that is divided into eight articulating aragonite valves embedded in the tough muscular girdle that surrounds the chiton's body. Compared with the single or two-piece shells of other molluscs, this arrangement allows chitons to roll into a protective ball when dislodged and to cling tightly to irregular surfaces. In some species the valves are reduced or covered by the girdle tissue. The valves are variously colored, patterned, smooth, or sculptured. 

The most anterior plate is crescent-shaped, and is known as the cephalic plate (sometimes called a head plate, despite the absence of a complete head). The most posterior plate is known as the anal plate (sometimes called the tail plate, although chitons do not have tails.)

The inner layer of each of the six intermediate plates is produced anteriorly as an articulating flange, called the articulamentum. This inner layer may also be produced laterally in the form of notched insertion plates. These function as an attachment of the valve plates to the soft body. A similar series of insertion plates may be attached to the convex anterior border of the cephalic plate or the convex posterior border of the anal plate.

The sculpture of the valves is one of the taxonomic characteristics, along with the granulation or spinulation of the girdle.

After a chiton dies, the individual valves which make up the eight-part shell come apart because the girdle is no longer holding them together, and then the plates sometimes wash up in beach drift. The individual shell plates from a chiton are sometimes known as butterfly shells due to their shape.

Girdle ornament 
The girdle may be ornamented with scales or spicules which, like the shell plates, are mineralized with aragonite — although a different mineralization process operates in the spicules to that in the teeth or shells (implying an independent evolutionary innovation). This process seems quite simple in comparison to other shell tissue; in some taxa, the crystal structure of the deposited minerals closely resembles the disordered nature of crystals that form inorganically, although more order is visible in other taxa.

The protein component of the scales and sclerites is minuscule in comparison with other biomineralized structures, whereas the total proportion of matrix is 'higher' than in mollusc shells. This implies that polysaccharides make up the bulk of the matrix. The girdle spines often bear length-parallel striations.

The wide form of girdle ornament suggests it serves a secondary role; chitons can survive perfectly well without them. Camouflage or defence are two likely functions. Certainly species such as some members of the genus Acanthochitona bear conspicuous paired tufts of spicules on the girdle. The spicules are sharp, and if carelessly handled, easily penetrate the human skin, where they detach and remain as a painful irritant. 

Spicules are secreted by cells that do not express engrailed, but these cells are surrounded by engrailed-expressing cells. These neighbouring cells secrete an organic pellicle on the outside of the developing spicule, whose aragonite is deposited by the central cell; subsequent division of this central cell allows larger spines to be secreted in certain taxa.
The organic pellicule is found in most polyplacophora (but not basal chitons, such as Hanleya) but is unusual in aplacophora. Developmentally, sclerite-secreting cells arise from pretrochal and postrochal cells: the 1a, 1d, 2a, 2c, 3c and 3d cells. The shell plates arise primarily from the 2d micromere, although 2a, 2b, 2c and sometimes 3c cells also participate in its secretion.

Internal anatomy
The girdle is often ornamented with spicules, bristles, hairy tufts, spikes, or snake-like scales. The majority of the body is a snail-like foot, but no head or other soft parts beyond the girdle are visible from the dorsal side.
The mantle cavity consists of a narrow channel on each side, lying between the body and the girdle. Water enters the cavity through openings in either side of the mouth, then flows along the channel to a second, exhalant, opening close to the anus. Multiple gills hang down into the mantle cavity along part or all of the lateral pallial groove, each consisting of a central axis with a number of flattened filaments through which oxygen can be absorbed.

The three-chambered heart is located towards the animal's hind end. Each of the two auricles collects blood from the gills on one side, while the muscular ventricle pumps blood through the aorta and round the body.

The excretory system consists of two nephridia, which connect to the pericardial cavity around the heart, and remove excreta through a pore that opens near the rear of the mantle cavity. The single gonad is located in front of the heart, and releases gametes through a pair of pores just in front of those used for excretion.

The mouth is located on the underside of the animal, and contains a tongue-like structure called a radula, which has numerous rows of 17 teeth each. The teeth are coated with magnetite, a hard ferric/ferrous oxide mineral. The radula is used to scrape microscopic algae off the substratum. The mouth cavity itself is lined with chitin and is associated with a pair of salivary glands. Two sacs open from the back of the mouth, one containing the radula, and the other containing a protrusible sensory subradular organ that is pressed against the substratum to taste for food.

Cilia pull the food through the mouth in a stream of mucus and through the oesophagus, where it is partially digested by enzymes from a pair of large pharyngeal glands. The oesophagus, in turn, opens into a stomach, where enzymes from a digestive gland complete the breakdown of the food. Nutrients are absorbed through the linings of the stomach and the first part of the intestine. The intestine is divided in two by a sphincter, with the latter part being highly coiled and functioning to compact the waste matter into faecal pellets. The anus opens just behind the foot.

Chitons lack a clearly demarcated head; their nervous system resembles a dispersed ladder. No true ganglia are present, as in other molluscs, although a ring of dense neural tissue occurs around the oesophagus. From this ring, nerves branch forwards to innervate the mouth and subradula, while two pairs of main nerve cords run back through the body. One pair, the pedal cords, innervate the foot, while the palliovisceral cords innervate the mantle and remaining internal organs.

Some species bear an array of tentacles in front of the head.

Senses

The primary sense organs of chitons are the subradular organ and a large number of unique organs called aesthetes. The aesthetes consist of light-sensitive cells just below the surface of the shell, although they are not capable of true vision. In some cases, however, they are modified to form ocelli, with a cluster of individual photoreceptor cells lying beneath a small aragonite-based lens. Each lens can form clear images, and is composed of relatively large, highly crystallographically-aligned grains to minimize light scattering. An individual chiton may have thousands of such ocelli. These aragonite-based eyes make them capable of true vision; though research continues as to the extent of their visual acuity. It is known that they can differentiate between a predator's shadow and changes in light caused by clouds. An evolutionary trade-off has led to a compromise between the eyes and the shell; as the size and complexity of the eyes increase, the mechanical performance of their shells decrease, and vice versa.

Although chitons lack osphradia, statocysts, and other sensory organs common to other molluscs, they do have numerous tactile nerve endings, especially on the girdle and within the mantle cavity.

The order Lepidopleurida also have a pigmented sensory organ called the Schwabe organ. Its function remains largely unknown, and has been suggested to be related to that of a larval eye.

However, chitons lack a cerebral ganglion.

Homing ability
Similar to many species of saltwater limpets, several species of chiton are known to exhibit homing behaviours, journeying to feed and then returning to the exact spot they previously inhabited. The method they use to perform such behaviors has been investigated to some extent, but remains unknown. One theory has the chitons remembering the topographic profile of the region, thus being able to guide themselves back to their home scar by a physical knowledge of the rocks and visual input from their numerous primitive eyespots.
The sea snail Nerita textilis (like all gastropods) deposits a mucus trail as it moves, which a chemoreceptive organ is able to detect and guide the snail back to its home site. It is unclear if chiton homing functions in the same way, but they may leave chemical cues along the rock surface and at the home scar which their olfactory senses can detect and home in on. Furthermore, older trails may also be detected, providing further stimulus for the chiton to find its home.

The radular teeth of chitons are made of magnetite, and the iron crystals within these may be involved in magnetoception, the ability to sense the polarity and the inclination of the Earth's magnetic field. Experimental work has suggested that chitons can detect and respond to magnetism.

Culinary uses
Chitons are eaten in several parts of the world. This includes islands in the Caribbean, such as Trinidad, Tobago, The Bahamas, St. Maarten, Aruba, Bonaire, Anguilla and Barbados, as well as in Bermuda. They are also traditionally eaten in certain parts of the Philippines, where it is called kibet if raw and chiton if fried. Native Americans of the Pacific coasts of North America eat chitons. They are a common food on the Pacific coast of South America and in the Galápagos. The foot of the chiton is prepared in a manner similar to abalone. Some islanders living in South Korea also eat chiton, slightly boiled and mixed with vegetables and hot sauce. Aboriginal people in Australia also eat chiton; for example they are recorded in the Narungga Nation Traditional Fishing Agreement.

Life habits

A chiton creeps along slowly on a muscular foot. It has considerable power of adhesion and can cling to rocks very powerfully, like a limpet.

Chitons are generally herbivorous grazers, though some are omnivorous and some carnivorous. They eat algae, bryozoans, diatoms, barnacles, and sometimes bacteria by scraping the rocky substrate with their well-developed radulae.

A few species of chitons are predatory, such as the small western Pacific species Placiphorella velata. These predatory chitons have enlarged anterior girdles. They catch other small invertebrates, such as shrimp and possibly even small fish, by holding the enlarged, hood-like front end of the girdle up off the surface, and then clamping down on unsuspecting, shelter-seeking prey.

Reproduction and life cycle

Chitons have separate sexes, and fertilization is usually external. The male releases sperm into the water, while the female releases eggs either individually, or in a long string. In most cases, fertilization takes place either in the surrounding water, or in the mantle cavity of the female. Some species brood the eggs within the mantle cavity, and the species Callistochiton viviparus even retains them within the ovary and gives birth to live young, an example of ovoviviparity.

The egg has a tough spiny coat, and usually hatches to release a free-swimming trochophore larva, typical of many other mollusc groups. In a few cases, the trochophore remains within the egg (and is then called lecithotrophic – deriving nutrition from yolk), which hatches to produce a miniature adult. Unlike most other molluscs, there is no intermediate stage, or veliger, between the trochophore and the adult. Instead, a segmented shell gland forms on one side of the larva, and a foot forms on the opposite side. When the larva is ready to become an adult, the body elongates, and the shell gland secretes the plates of the shell. Unlike the fully grown adult, the larva has a pair of simple eyes, although these may remain for some time in the immature adult.

Predators
Animals which prey on chitons include humans, seagulls, sea stars, crabs, lobsters and fish.

Evolutionary origins
Chitons have a relatively good fossil record, stretching back to the Cambrian, with the genus Preacanthochiton, known from fossils found in Late Cambrian deposits in Missouri, being classified as the earliest known polyplacophoran. However, the exact phylogenetic position of supposed Cambrian chitons is highly controversial, and some authors have instead argued that the earliest confirmed polyplacophorans date back to the Early Ordovician. Kimberella and Wiwaxia of the Precambrian and Cambrian may be related to ancestral polyplacophorans. Matthevia is a Late Cambrian polyplacophoran preserved as individual pointed valves, and sometimes considered to be a chiton, although at the closest, it can only be a stem-group member of the group. 

Based on this and co-occurring fossils, one plausible hypothesis for the origin of polyplacophora has that they formed when an aberrant monoplacophoran was born with multiple centres of calcification, rather than the usual one. Selection quickly acted on the resultant conical shells to form them to overlap into protective armour; their original cones are homologous to the tips of the plates of modern chitons.

The chitons evolved from multiplacophora during the Palaeozoic, with their relatively conserved modern-day body plan being fixed by the Mesozoic.

The earliest fossil evidence of aesthetes in chitons comes from around 400 Ma, during the Early Devonian.

History of scientific investigation
Chitons were first studied by Carl Linnaeus in his 1758 10th edition of Systema Naturae. Since his description of the first four species, chitons have been variously classified. They were called Cyclobranchians (round arm) in the early 19th century, and then grouped with the aplacophorans in the subphylum Amphineura in 1876. The class Polyplacophora was named by de Blainville 1816.

Etymology
The name chiton is New Latin derived from the Ancient Greek word khitōn, meaning tunic (which also is the source of the word chitin). The Ancient Greek word khitōn can be traced to the Central Semitic word *kittan, which is from the Akkadian words kitû or kita'um, meaning flax or linen, and originally the Sumerian word gada or gida.

The Greek-derived name Polyplacophora comes from the words poly- (many), plako- (tablet), and -phoros (bearing), a reference to the chiton's eight shell plates.

Taxonomy
Most classification schemes in use today are based, at least in part, on Pilsbry's Manual of Conchology (1892–1894), extended and revised by Kaas and Van Belle (1985–1990).

Since chitons were first described by Linnaeus (1758), extensive taxonomic studies at the species level have been made. However, the taxonomic classification at higher levels in the group has remained somewhat unsettled.

The most recent classification, by Sirenko (2006), is based not only on shell morphology, as usual, but also other important features, including aesthetes, girdle, radula, gills, glands, egg hull projections, and spermatozoids. It includes all the living and extinct genera of chitons.

Further resolution within the Chitonida has been recovered through molecular analysis.

This system is now generally accepted.
 Class Polyplacophora de Blainville, 1816
 Subclass Paleoloricata Bergenhayn, 1955
 Order Chelodida Bergenhayn, 1943
 Family Chelodidae Bergenhayn, 1943
 Chelodes Davidson & King, 1874
 Euchelodes Marek, 1962
 Calceochiton Flower, 1968
 Order Septemchitonida Bergenhayn, 1955
 Family Gotlandochitonidae Bergenhayn, 1955
 Gotlandochiton Bergenhayn, 1955
 Family Helminthochitonidae Van Belle, 1975
 Kindbladochiton Van Belle, 1975
 Diadelochiton Hoare, 2000
 Helminthochiton Salter in Griffith & M'Coy, 1846
 Echinochiton Pojeta, Eernisse, Hoare & Henderson, 2003
 Family Septemchitonidae Bergenhayn, 1955
 Septemchiton Bergenhayn, 1955
 Paleochiton A. G. Smith, 1964
 Thairoplax Cherns, 1998
 Subclass Loricata Shumacher, 1817
 Order Lepidopleurida Thiele, 1910
 Suborder Cymatochitonina Sirenko & Starobogatov, 1977
 Family Acutichitonidae Hoare, Mapes & Atwater, 1983
 Acutichiton Hoare, Sturgeon & Hoare, 1972
 Elachychiton Hoare, Sturgeon & Hoare, 1972
 Harpidochiton Hoare & Cook, 2000
 Arcochiton Hoare, Sturgeon & Hoare, 1972
 Kraterochiton Hoare, 2000
 Soleachiton Hoare, Sturgeon & Hoare, 1972
 Asketochiton Hoare & Sabattini, 2000
 Family †Cymatochitonidae Sirenko & Starobogatov, 1977
 Cymatochiton Dall, 1882
 Compsochiton Hoare & Cook, 2000
 Family Gryphochitonidae Pilsbry, 1900
 Gryphochiton Gray, 1847
 Family Lekiskochitonidae Smith & Hoare, 1987
 Lekiskochiton Hoare & Smith, 1984
 Family Permochitonidae Sirenko & Starobogatov, 1977
 Permochiton Iredale & Hull, 1926
 Suborder Lepidopleurina Thiele, 1910
 Family Abyssochitonidae (synonym: Ferreiraellidae) Dell' Angelo & Palazzi, 1991
 Glaphurochiton Raymond, 1910
 ?Pyknochiton Hoare, 2000
 ?Hadrochiton Hoare, 2000
 Ferreiraella Sirenko, 1988
 Family Glyptochitonidae Starobogatov & Sirenko, 1975
 Glyptochiton Konninck, 1883
 Family Leptochitonidae Dall, 1889
 Colapterochiton Hoare & Mapes, 1985
 Coryssochiton DeBrock, Hoare & Mapes, 1984
 Proleptochiton Sirenko & Starobogatov, 1977
 Schematochiton Hoare, 2002
 Pterochiton (Carpenter MS) Dall, 1882
 Leptochiton Gray, 1847
 Parachiton Thiele, 1909
 Terenochiton Iredale, 1914
 Trachypleura Jaeckel, 1900
 Pseudoischnochiton Ashby, 1930
 Lepidopleurus Risso, 1826
 Hanleyella Sirenko, 1973
 Family †Camptochitonidae Sirenko, 1997
 Camptochiton DeBrock, Hoare & Mapes, 1984
 Pedanochiton DeBrock, Hoare & Mapes, 1984
 Euleptochiton Hoare & Mapes, 1985
 Pileochiton DeBrock, Hoare & Mapes, 1984
 Chauliochiton Hoare & Smith, 1984
 Stegochiton Hoare & Smith, 1984
 Family Nierstraszellidae Sirenko, 1992
 Nierstraszella Sirenko, 1992
 Family Mesochitonidae Dell' Angelo & Palazzi, 1989
 Mesochiton Van Belle, 1975
 Pterygochiton Rochebrune, 1883
 Family Protochitonidae Ashby, 1925
 Protochiton Ashby, 1925
 Deshayesiella (Carpenter MS) Dall, 1879
 Oldroydia Dall, 1894
 Family Hanleyidae Bergenhayn, 1955
 Hanleya Gray, 1857
 Hemiarthrum Dall, 1876
 Order Chitonida Thiele, 1910
 Suborder Chitonina Thiele, 1910
 Superfamily Chitonoidea Rafinesque, 1815
 Family Ochmazochitonidae Hoare & Smith, 1984
 Ochmazochiton Hoare & Smith, 1984
 Family Ischnochitonidae Dall, 1889
 Ischnochiton Gray, 1847
 Stenochiton H. Adams & Angas, 1864
 Stenoplax (Carpenter MS) Dall, 1879
 Lepidozona Pilsbry, 1892
 Stenosemus Middendorff, 1847
 Subterenochiton Iredale & Hull, 1924
 Thermochiton Saito & Okutani, 1990
 Connexochiton Kaas, 1979
 Tonicina Thiele, 1906
 Family Callistoplacidae Pilsbry, 1893
 Ischnoplax Dall, 1879
 Callistochiton Carpenter MS, Dall, 1879
 Callistoplax Dall, 1882
 Ceratozona Dall, 1882
 Calloplax Thiele, 1909
 Family Chaetopleuridae Plate, 1899
 Chaetopleura Shuttleworth, 1853
 Dinoplax Carpenter MS, Dall, 1882
 Family Loricidae Iredale & Hull, 1923
 Lorica H. & A. Adams, 1852
 Loricella Pilsbry, 1893
 Oochiton Ashby, 1929
 Family Callochitonidae Plate, 1901
 Callochiton Gray, 1847
 Eudoxochiton Shuttleworth, 1853
 Vermichiton Kaas, 1979
 Family Chitonidae Rafinesque, 1815
 Subfamily Chitoninae Rafinesque, 1815
 Chiton Linnaeus, 1758
 Amaurochiton Thiele, 1893
 Radsia Gray, 1847
 Sypharochiton Thiele, 1893
 Nodiplax Beu, 1967
 Rhyssoplax Thiele, 1893
 Teguloaplax Iredale & Hull, 1926
 Mucrosquama Iredale, 1893
 Subfamily Toniciinae Pilsbry, 1893
 Tonicia Gray, 1847
 Onithochiton Gray, 1847
 Subfamily Acanthopleurinae Dall, 1889
 Acanthopleura Guilding, 1829
 Liolophura Pilsbry, 1893
 Enoplochiton Gray, 1847
 Squamopleura Nierstrasz, 1905
 Superfamily Schizochitonoidea Dall, 1889
 Family Schizochitonidae Dall, 1889
 Incissiochiton Van Belle, 1985
 Schizochiton Gray, 1847
 Suborder Acanthochitonina Bergenhayn, 1930
 Superfamily Mopalioidea Dall, 1889
 Family Tonicellidae Simroth, 1894
 Subfamily Tonicellinae Simroth, 1894
 Lepidochitona Gray, 1821
 Particulazona Kaas, 1993
 Boreochiton Sars, 1878
 Tonicella Carpenter, 1873
 Nuttallina (Carpenter MS) Dall, 1871
 Spongioradsia Pilsbry, 1894
 Oligochiton Berry, 1922
 Subfamily Juvenichitoninae Sirenko, 1975
 Juvenichiton Sirenko, 1975
 Micichiton Sirenko, 1975
 Nanichiton Sirenko, 1975
 Family Schizoplacidae Bergenhayn, 1955
 Schizoplax Dall, 1878
 Family Mopaliidae Dall, 1889
 Subfamily Heterochitoninae Van Belle, 1978
 Heterochiton Fucini, 1912
 Allochiton Fucini, 1912
 Subfamily Mopaliinae Dall, 1889
 Aerilamma Hull, 1924
 Guildingia Pilsbry, 1893
 Frembleya H. Adams, 1866
 Diaphoroplax Iredale, 1914
 Plaxiphora Gray, 1847
 Placiphorina Kaas & Van Belle, 1994
 Nuttallochiton Plate, 1899
 Mopalia Gray, 1847
 Maorichiton Iredale, 1914
 Placiphorella (Carpenter MS) Dall, 1879
 Katharina Gray, 1847
 Amicula Gray, 1847
 Superfamily Cryptoplacoidea H. & A. Adams, 1858
 Family Acanthochitonidae Pilsbry, 1893
 Subfamily Acanthochitoninae Pilsbry, 1893
 Acanthochitona Gray, 1921
 Craspedochiton Shuttleworth, 1853
 Spongiochiton (Carpenter MS) Dall, 1882
 Notoplax H. Adams, 1861
 Pseudotonicia Ashby, 1928
 Bassethullia Pilsbry, 1928
 Americhiton Watters, 1990
 Choneplax (Carpenter MS) Dall, 1882
 Cryptoconchus (de Blainville MS) Burrow, 1815
 Subfamily Cryptochitoninae Pilsbry, 1893
 Cryptochiton Middendorff, 1847
 Family Hemiarthridae Sirenko, 1997
 Hemiarthrum Carpenter in Dall, 1876
 Weedingia Kaas, 1988
 Family Choriplacidae Ashby, 1928
 Choriplax Pilsbry, 1894
 Family Cryptoplacidae H. & A. Adams, 1858
 Cryptoplax de Blainville, 1818
 Incertae sedis
 Family Scanochitonidae Bergenhayn, 1955
 Scanochiton Bergenhayn, 1955
 Family Olingechitonidae Starobogatov & Sirenko, 1977
 Olingechiton Bergenhayn, 1943
 Family Haeggochitonidae Sirenko & Starobogatov, 1977
 Haeggochiton Bergenhayn, 1955
 Family Ivoechitonidae Sirenko & Starobogatov, 1977
 Ivoechiton Bergenhayn, 1955

References

External links

 Extensive list of species, classified by families

Chitons
Extant Devonian first appearances